Kleine Luppe is a river of Saxony, Germany. It is a tributary of the Nahle near Leutzsch.

See also
List of rivers of Saxony

References

Rivers of Saxony
Rivers of Germany